= Gourmet-Guru =

Food distributor

Gourmet Guru, Inc. is a New York–based natural and organic food distributor founded in 1996 by Jeff Lichtenstein. At initial stage of Gourmet Guru, Jeff distributed natural & Organic Food by the old truck. Gourmet Guru embracing Organic & Natural Food, before USDA officially defined terms.

Gourmet Guru launched new product in partnership with Sweet’tauk. Sweet’tauk lemonade is a fresh-squeezed & cold-pressed HPP lemonade. In 2016, Gourmet Guru celebrated its 20th anniversary.

== Awards and recognition ==
- 2011- Mayor Michael Bloomberg bestowed the title of Small Business of the Year for the Bronx.
- 2012- ICIC Inner City 100 Award for speedy growth or being one of the fastest growing inner city firms in the United States.
- The delegation of British parliamentarians visited company headquarters in Bronx as part of their trip to local businesses.
